Thorsten Schlumberger (born 29 October 1960 in Hamburg) is a former professional German footballer.

Career
Schlumberger made eight appearances in the Bundesliga and 228 in the 2. Bundesliga during his playing career.

External links 
 

1960 births
Living people
Footballers from Hamburg
German footballers
Association football forwards
Bundesliga players
2. Bundesliga players
Hamburger SV players
Hertha BSC players
Tennis Borussia Berlin players
SV Wilhelmshaven players